Group DF is a diversified international group of companies whose assets are concentrated in the chemical industry, titanium production, gas, and banking sectors. In addition, the group has interests in several other areas: agriculture, media business, sodium carbonate, energy infrastructure, and real estate. Group DF operates in 11 countries in the Eurasian region. In Ukraine, the group is developing businesses that can transform the landscape of industries and increase the country's competitiveness in the global market. The founder and owner of Group DF is businessman and philanthropist Dmytro Firtash, who in 2007 consolidated the assets he owned into the group. The managing director of the group is Boris Krasnyansky. In 2012, Group DF's consolidated revenue amounted to more than US$6 billion. This figure was announced by Borys Krasnyansky at the conference, "Ukraine – Inside View" (organized by The Economist) in March 2013 which was held in Vienna. The Group plans to continue to increase and consolidate assets across all of its business sectors, including fertilizer, titanium, gas distribution, and agriculture.

See also
Ostchem Holding
Sievierodonetsk Association Azot
Azot (Cherkasy)

References

Companies of Ukraine
Companies established in 2007
Oil and gas companies of Ukraine
Buildings and structures destroyed during the 2022 Russian invasion of Ukraine